Jeong Byeong-jin (born October 25, 1996 in Chuncheon) is a South Korean male curler from Gyeonggi Province

Teams

References

External links

Video: 

Living people
1996 births
People from Chuncheon
Sportspeople from Gyeonggi Province
South Korean male curlers

Competitors at the 2019 Winter Universiade
21st-century South Korean people